The State Prize of Ukraine in the field of education is a state award of Ukraine established to celebrate outstanding achievements in the field of education in the following categories:

preschool and extracurricular education
secondary education
vocational and technical education
higher education
scientific achievements in the field of education

Laureates 
Serhii Kivalov
Vasyl Lazoryshynets
Mykola Polyakov
Anatoly Samoilenko
Valerii Semenets
Serhiy Shkarlet
Andriy Slyusarchuk
Mykhaylo Zagirnyak

See also 
List of Ukrainian State Prizes

References 

State Prizes of Ukraine
Awards established in 2006
2006 establishments in Ukraine
Laureates of the State Prize of Ukraine in the field of education